Berkey is a surname. Notable people with the surname include:

Charles Peter Berkey (born 1867), American engineering geologist
Craig Berkey (born 1962), Canadian sound engineer
Dennis D. Berkey, American academic administrator
Jackson Berkey (born 1942), American composer, pianist, and singer
James L. Berkey (1930–1982), American set decorator
Jean Berkey (1938–2013), American politician
John Berkey (1932–2008), American artist
Jonathan Berkey, American historian
Joshua H. Berkey (1852-1911), American Prohibitionist politician
Russell S. Berkey (1893–1985), United States Navy admiral

See also
Berkey, Ohio, village in Lucas County, Ohio, United States